Fairport Live Convention is a 1974 live album by British folk rock band Fairport Convention originally released in 1974 by Island Records. It was recorded live at the Sydney Opera House, the London Rainbow and the Fairfield Halls, Croydon by John Wood and mixed down at Sound Techniques, London. It was produced by Trevor Lucas & John Wood.

The album was titled A Moveable Feast in the United States and Canada and Fairport Convention Live '75 in Germany.

The original UK LP issue included an inner sleeve photograph of the band posing on the steps of the Sydney Opera House, with Dave Mattacks sporting a shirt bearing the prominent legend "Harrison Birtwistle where its at".

Track listing

Side one
"Matty Groves" (Traditional; arranged by Denny, Pegg, Mattacks, Lucas, Swarbrick, Donahue)
"Rosie" (Swarbrick)
"Fiddlestix" (Traditional; arranged by Lucas, Swarbrick, Donahue, Mattacks, Pegg)
"John the Gun" (Denny)
"Something You Got" (Chris Kenner)

Side two
"Sloth" (Thompson, Swarbrick)
"Dirty Linen" (Traditional; arranged by Swarbrick)
"Down in the Flood" (Bob Dylan)
"Sir B. MacKenzie" (Swarbrick, Thompson, Nicol, Mattacks)

Bonus tracks on CD reissue
"The Hexhamshire Lass" (Bob Davenport, Traditional; arranged by Fairport Convention) – 4.09
"Polly on the Shore" (Traditional; arranged by Dave Swarbrick, Trevor Lucas) – 5.12
"Bring 'Em Down" (Trevor Lucas) – 11.39
"Far From Me" (John Prine) – 3.16
"That'll Be the Day" (Jerry Allison, Buddy Holly, Norman Petty) – 3.19

Personnel
Sandy Denny – vocals, piano
Trevor Lucas – acoustic guitars, vocals
Jerry Donahue – electric guitar, vocals
Dave Swarbrick – fiddle, vocals
Dave Pegg – bass guitar
Dave Mattacks – drums

Also credited on the original LP sleeve - stage mix by Phil Benton and Roger Proctor, photographs by Stephen Westlund and design co-ordination by Fabio Nicoll Associates and Dave Mattacks.

References

External links
 Fan site with trivia and reissue details

Sandy Denny albums
Albums produced by John Wood (record producer)
Fairport Convention live albums
1974 live albums
Island Records live albums
Albums recorded at the Sydney Opera House